The Carotid–Kundalini function is closely associated with Carotid-Kundalini fractals coined by popular science columnist Clifford A. Pickover and it is defined as follows:

See also
arccos

References

External links
Carotid–Kundalini function
Carotid-Kundalini Fractal Explorer

Special functions